Quebecers or Quebeckers (Québécois in French, and sometimes also in English) are people associated with Quebec. The term is most often used in reference to descendants of the French settlers in Quebec but it can also be used to describe people of any ethnicity who live in the province.

Self-identification as Québécois became dominant starting in the 1960s; prior to this, the francophone people of Quebec mostly identified themselves as French Canadians and as Canadiens before anglophones started identifying as Canadians as well. A majority in the House of Commons of Canada in 2006 approved a motion tabled by Prime Minister Stephen Harper, which stated that the Québécois are a nation within a united Canada. Harper later elaborated that the motion's definition of Québécois relies on personal decisions to self-identify as Québécois, and therefore is a personal choice. However, Gilles Duceppe, the leader of the Bloc Québécois, a sovereigntist party which then held the majority of federal seats in Quebec, disputed this view, stating that the Bloc considered the term "Québécois" to include all inhabitants of Quebec and accusing the Conservatives of wishing to ascribe an ethnic meaning to it.

Nomenclature
Sometimes, it is used more generally to refer to any inhabitant of Quebec. It can refer to French spoken in Quebec. It may also be used, with an upper- or lower-case initial, as an adjective relating to  Quebec, or to the French-Canadian culture of Quebec. A resident or native of Quebec is often referred to in English as a Quebecer or Quebecker. In French, Québécois or Québécoise usually refers to any native or resident of Quebec. Its use became more prominent in the 1960s as French Canadians  from Quebec increasingly self-identified as Québécois.

English usage
English expressions employing the term may imply specific reference to francophones; such as "Québécois music", "a Québécois rocker"  or "Québécois literature".

Ethnic designation in French

Dictionaries
The dictionary Le Petit Robert, published in France, states that the adjective québécois, in addition to its territorial meaning, may refer specifically to francophone or French Canadian culture in Quebec. The dictionary gives as examples cinéma québécois and littérature québécoise.

However, an ethnic or linguistic sense is absent from "Le Petit Larousse, also published in France, as well as from French dictionaries published in Canada such as Le Dictionnaire québécois d'aujourd'hui and Le Dictionnaire du français Plus, which indicate instead Québécois francophone "francophone Quebecer" in the linguistic sense.

The online dictionary Grand dictionnaire terminologique of the Office québécois de la langue française mentions only a territorial meaning for Québécois.

Other opinion
Newspaper editor Lysiane Gagnon has referred to an ethnic sense of the word Québécois in both English and French.

Etymology 

The name "Quebec" comes from a Mi'kmaq word k'webeq meaning "where the waters get narrow" and originally referred to the area around Quebec City, where the Saint Lawrence River narrows to a cliff-lined gap. French explorer Samuel de Champlain chose this name in 1608 for the colonial outpost he would use as the administrative seat for the French colony of Canada and New France. The Province of Quebec was first founded as a British colony in the Royal Proclamation of 1763 after the Treaty of Paris formally transferred the French colony of New France to Britain after the Seven Years' War. Quebec City remained the capital.  In 1774, Guy Carleton obtained from the British Government the Quebec Act, which gave Canadiens most of the territory they held before 1763; the right of religion; and their right of language and culture.  The British Government did this to in order to keep their loyalty, in the face of a growing menace of independence from the 13 original British colonies.

Québécois as an ethnicity
As shown by the 2016 Statistics Canada census, 58.3% of residents of Quebec identify their ethnicity as Canadian, 23.5% as French and 0.4% as Acadian. Roughly 2.3% of residents, or 184,005 people, describe their ethnicity as Québécois.

Québécois identity 

The term became more common in English as Québécois largely replacing French Canadian as an expression of cultural and national identity among French Canadians living in Quebec during the Quiet Revolution of the 1960s. The predominant French Canadian nationalism and identity of previous generations was  based on the protection of the French language, the Roman Catholic Church, and Church-run institutions across Canada and in parts of the United States. In contrast, the modern Québécois identity is secular and based on a social democratic ideal of an active Quebec government promoting the French language and French-speaking culture in the arts, education, and business within the Province of Quebec. Politically, this resulted in a push towards more autonomy for Quebec and an internal debate on Quebec independence and identity that continues to this day. The emphasis on the French language and Quebec autonomy means that French-speakers across Canada now self-identify more specifically with provincial or regional identity-tags, such as acadienne, or franco-canadienne, franco-manitobaine, franco-ontarienne or fransaskoise. Terms such as Franco-Ontarian and Franco-Manitoban are still predominant. Francophones and anglophones use many terms  when discussing issues of francophone linguistic and cultural identity in English.

Québécois nation 

The political shift towards a new Quebec nationalism in the 1960s led to Québécois increasingly referring to provincial institutions as being national.  This was reflected in the change of the provincial Legislative Assembly to National Assembly in 1968. Nationalism reached an apex the 1970s and 1990s, with contentious constitutional debates resulting in close to half of all of French-speaking Québécois seeking recognition of nation status through tight referendums on Quebec sovereignty in 1980 and 1995. Having lost both referendums, the sovereigntist Parti Québécois government renewed the push for recognition as a nation through symbolic motions that gained the support of all parties in the National Assembly. They affirmed the right to determine the independent status of Quebec. They also renamed the area around Quebec City the Capitale-Nationale (national capital) region and renamed provincial parks Parcs Nationaux (national parks). In opposition in October 2003, the Parti Québécois tabled a motion that was unanimously adopted in the National Assembly affirming that the Quebec people formed a nation.  Bloc Québécois leader Gilles Duceppe scheduled a similar motion in the House of Commons for November 23, 2006, that would have recognized "Quebecers as a nation". Conservative Prime Minister Stephen Harper tabled the Québécois nation motion the day before the Bloc Québécois resolution came to a vote. The English version changed the word Quebecer to Québécois and added "within a united Canada" at the end of the Bloc motion.

The "Québécois nation" was recognized  by the House of Commons of Canada  on November 27, 2006. The Prime Minister specified that the motion used the "cultural" and "sociological" as opposed to the "legal" sense of the word "nation". According to Harper, the motion was of a symbolic political nature, representing no constitutional change, no recognition of Quebec sovereignty, and no legal change in its political relations within the federation. The Prime Minister has further elaborated, stating that the motion's definition of Québécois relies on personal decisions to self-identify as Québécois, and therefore is a personal choice.

Despite near-universal support in the House of Commons, several important dissenters criticized the motion. Intergovernmental Affairs minister Michael Chong resigned from his position and abstained from voting, arguing that this motion was too ambiguous and had the potential of recognizing a destructive ethnic nationalism in Canada.  Liberals were the most divided on the issue and represented 15 of the 16 votes against the motion. Liberal MP Ken Dryden summarized the view of many of these dissenters, maintaining that it was a game of semantics that cheapened issues of national identity. A survey by Leger Marketing in November 2006 showed that Canadians were deeply divided on this issue.  When asked if Québécois are a nation, only 53 per cent of Canadians agreed, 47 per cent disagreed, with 33 per cent strongly disagreeing; 78 per cent of French-speaking Canadians agreed that Québécois are a nation, compared with 38 per cent of English-speaking Canadians. As well, 78 per cent of 1,000 Québécois polled thought that Québécois should be recognized as a nation.

Québécois in census and ethnographic studies 
The Québécois self-identify as an ethnic group in both the English and French versions of the Canadian census and in demographic studies of ethnicity in Canada.

In the 2016 census, 74,575 chose Québécois as one of multiple responses with 119,985 choosing it as a single response (194,555 as a combined response).

In the 2001 Census of Canada, 98,670 Canadians, or just over 1% of the population of Quebec identified "Québécois" as their ethnicity, ranking "Québécois" as the 37th most common response. These results were based on a question on residents in each household in Canada: "To which ethnic or cultural group(s) did this person's ancestors belong?", along with a list of sample choices ("Québécois" did not appear among the various sample choices). The ethnicity "Canadien" or Canadian, did appear as an example on the questionnaire, and was selected by 4.9 million people or 68.2% of the Quebec population.

In the more detailed Ethnic Diversity Survey,
Québécois was the most common ethnic identity in Quebec, reported by 37% of
Quebec's population aged 15 years and older, either as their only identity or alongside
other identities. The survey, based on interviews, asked the following questions: "1) I would now like to ask you about your ethnic ancestry, heritage or background. What were the ethnic or cultural origins of your ancestors? 2) In addition to "Canadian", what were the other ethnic or cultural origins of your ancestors on first coming to North America?" This survey did not list possible choices of ancestry and permitted multiple answers.
In census ethnic surveys, French-speaking Canadians identify their ethnicity most often as French, Canadien, Québécois, or French Canadian, with the latter three referred to by Jantzen (2005) as "French New World" ancestries because they originate in Canada. Jantzen (2005) distinguishes the English Canadian, meaning  "someone whose family has been in Canada for multiple generations", and the French Canadien, used to refer to descendants of the original settlers of New France in the 17th and 18th centuries.

Those reporting "French New World" ancestries overwhelmingly had ancestors that went back at least 4 generations in Canada: specifically, 90% of Québécois traced their ancestry back this far. Fourth generation Canadiens and Québécois showed considerable attachment to their ethno-cultural group, with 70% and 61% respectively reporting a strong sense of belonging.

The generational profile and strength of identity of French New World ancestries contrast with those of British or Canadian ancestries, which represent the largest ethnic identities in Canada. Although deeply rooted Canadians express a deep attachment to their ethnic identity, most English-speaking Canadians of British ancestry generally cannot trace their ancestry as far back in Canada as French-speakers.  As a result, their identification with their ethnicity is weaker tending to have a more broad based cultural identification: for example, only 50% of third generation "Canadians" strongly identify as such, bringing down the overall average. The survey report notes that 80% of Canadians whose families had been in Canada for three or more generations reported  "Canadian and provincial or regional ethnic identities".  These identities include  "Québécois" (37% of Quebec population), "Acadian" (6% of Atlantic provinces) and "Newfoundlander" (38% of  Newfoundland and Labrador).

Special terms using 'Québécois' 
French expressions employing "Québécois" often appear in both French and English.

Parti Québécois: Provincial-level political party that supports Quebec independence from Canada
Bloc Québécois: Federal-level political party that supports Quebec independence from Canada
Québécois de souche ("old-stock Quebecker"): Quebecer who can trace their ancestry back to the regime of New France
Québécois pure laine: "true blue" or "dyed-in-the-wool" Quebecker
Québécois francophone: "francophone Quebecer"
Québécois anglophone: "anglophone Quebecer"
néo-Québécois ("new Quebecers"): immigrant Quebecers
Le Québec aux Québécois ("Quebec for Québécois", or "Quebec for Quebecers"): slogan sometimes chanted at Quebec nationalist rallies or protests. This slogan can be controversial, as it might be interpreted both as a call for a Quebec controlled by Québécois pure laine, with possible xenophobic connotations, or as a call for a Quebec controlled by the inhabitants of the province of Quebec, and free from outside interference.

See also

Language demographics of Quebec
Culture of Quebec
Cuisine of Quebec
Symbols of Quebec
English-speaking Quebecers
Quebecer (disambiguation)
Quebec (disambiguation)

References

Further reading 

 
French-speaking ethnicities in Canada